Hotter than Hell may refer to:

 Hotter than Hell (album), a 1974 album by Kiss
 "Hotter than Hell" (Kiss song), the album's title song
 Hotter than Hell Tour, the album's associated concert tour
 Hotter than Hell Live, a 1990 album by Barren Cross
 "Hotter than Hell" (Dua Lipa song), 2016
Hotter than Hell (Dua Lipa Tour), associated concert tour